Marlon Abela (born 1975) is a Lebanese-British restaurateur, businessman and columnist. He is the founder and chairman of the Marlon Abela Restaurant Corporation (MARC), a privately owned international hospitality company based in Mayfair, London.

Early life
Marlon Abela was born in Lebanon in 1975. His father, Albert Abela, was the chairman of the Abela Group, a catering business, and a luxury hotelier. His mother, Barbel, is German.

Abela grew up in Grasse, France, and Monaco.

Career
Abela started working for his father's business at the age of seventeen. By 2001, he served as its executive vice president.

Abela founded the Marlon Abela Restaurant Corporation (MARC) in 2001. The company is headquartered in Mayfair. Abela serves as its chairman. Via the company, he is the owner of Umu and The Greenhouse, two restaurants in Mayfair, London. Both restaurants received two Michelin stars. He also became the owner of Morton's Club, a private members club on Berkeley Square in Mayfair. In Manhattan, New York City, he owned another restaurant called A Voce, which closed.

With François Payard, Marlon Abela co-founded François Payard Bakeries, a chain of bakeries, which closed in New York in 2018. In 2014, Marlon Abela acquired the historical wine merchant OW Loeb. In early 2018 a series of delays in payments to suppliers and deliveries to clients triggered a series of hostile press articles. Abelas's company said in January 2018 "O.W.Loeb intends to honour its commitments to their clients and is in the process of doing so." The company relocated to the MARC head office in Mayfair with new senior personnel, and said that Abela was "looking forward to implementing new strategies".

Abela is a columnist for Spear's Magazine, where he writes about wine.

Abela was served with a bankruptcy petition by lawyers in October 2019. In 2020 The Square was shut down by administrators during lunch service, Umu went  into administration, and Morton's Club also ceased trading.
However, Umu is still trading under new ownership.

Personal life
In 2011 Marlon Abela married Nadya Abela, originally from Russia and they have two children together. Marlon has two more children from his first marriage. Nadya announced on Instagram that she is now separated from him.

References

1975 births
Living people
Lebanese restaurateurs
Lebanese company founders
Lebanese columnists
British restaurateurs
British gastronomes
British company founders
British columnists
Lebanese people of German descent
British people of Lebanese descent
British people of German descent
Wine writers
Lebanese emigrants to the United Kingdom
Lebanese expatriates in France
Lebanese expatriates in Monaco